Diarios de la cuarentena (Spanish: Quarantine diaries) is a Spanish comedy television series produced by RTVE that aired on La 1 from April 7 to May 20, 2020. It stars José Luis García Pérez, Petra Martínez, Carlos Bardem and Fernando Colomo, among others.

Production
The series arose during the lockdown suffered in Spain due to COVID-19. Its production was announced on April 2, 2020.

Since the actors had to film the scenes from their homes, as they were under lockdown themselves, they were given a basic filming kit with mobile, tripod and microphone.

Plot
It features the lives of several people during the lockdown, in a total of 10 different houses showing how they cope with this situation the best they can.

Cast 
Cecilia Gessa
 Carlos Bardem
Fernando Colomo - Fermín
Carlos Areces - Richi
Gorka Otxoa
Adrià Collado
Ana Alonso - Ana
Montse Pla
Víctor Clavijo - Víctor
Mónica Regueiro
Fele Martínez
Cristina Alarcón
José Luis García Pérez - José Luis
Petra Martínez - Petra
Juan Margallo - Juan
 Carmen Arrufat

Reception

Ratings
The first episode was seen by 1,697,000 people (8,4% of the total viewers)

Critical response
The series sparked controversy even before its premiere. Some social network users called for a boycott due to considering it an unnecessary mockery of the more than 13,000 deaths by COVID-19 in Spain.

Deputy in the Assembly of Madrid Jaime de Berenguer (of the Vox party) harshly criticized the series calling it propaganda. TVE responded alleging that the series has a low cost and that it is not an unnecessary expense of money.

After the first episode was aired the critics of the professionals were varied; website Vertele praised the good technical production despite the difficult conditions in which it was made, but criticized that the characters do not reflect the diversity of Spanish society and the lack of interesting plots. The website Espinof called it a "harmless way of passing time".

References

2020s Spanish comedy television series
2020 Spanish television series debuts
2020 Spanish television series endings
COVID-19 pandemic in Spain
La 1 (Spanish TV channel) network series
Spanish television sitcoms